Semafor is a news website founded in 2022 by Ben Smith, a former editor-in-chief of BuzzFeed News and media columnist at The New York Times, and Justin B. Smith, the former CEO of Bloomberg Media Group.

Etymology 
The name of the publication derives from the Ancient Greek word semaphore. According to The New York Times, the term refers to "a visual signaling apparatus often involving flags, lights and arm gestures".

History
In early January 2022, Ben Smith announced he would be leaving The New York Times to start a global news venture aimed at the 200 million college-educated English readers. Justin B. Smith would lead the business side of the new venture and Ben Smith would be the top editor. The news site says it will break news and supplant complex news stories. In a memo that Justin Smith sent to "close confidants", he described a new company that would "reimagine quality global journalism" aimed at what he said was an "English-speaking, college-educated, professional class" that had "lost trust in all sources of news and information".

Initial investors included journalist Jessica Lessin, and David G. Bradley, co-owner of The Atlantic magazine, raising about $25 million before launch. The largest investor, at $10 million, was Sam Bankman-Fried, founder of the now-bankrupt cryptocurrency exchange FTX. After Bankman-Freid's arrest for suspected fraud, Semafor announced plans to buy out his investment, and stated he, nor any other investors, had influence on editorial coverage or operations.

Semafor launched on October 18, 2022, with Gina Chua as executive editor. Staff writers include Reed Albergotti and David Weigel, both formerly of the Washington Post, and Liz Hoffmann, formerly of the Wall Street Journal. Justin Smith and Ben Smith serve, respectively, as CEO and editor-in-chief.

Ties to the Chinese Communist Party 
Semafor has received criticism for its relationship with persons or entities with ties to the Chinese Communist Party (CCP). In January 2023, Voice of America reported that Semafor received sponsorship funding from the Chinese e-commerce giant, Alibaba Group. According to The New York Times, Alibaba has developed and marketed facial recognition and surveillance software configured to detect Uyghur faces and those of other ethnic minorities in China.

In February 2023, Semafor partnered with the Center for China and Globalization, a front group of the United Front Work Department, a CCP propaganda and influence organization. As part of this partnership, the publication established an advisory board which includes Zeng Yuqun, the billionaire chairman of Contemporary Amperex Technology Co, a company with "deep CCP ties" according to George Washington University economist Diana Furchtgott-Roth. Zeng is also a member of the Chinese People's Political Consultative Conference, the party's most important united front organization. The group also includes Wang Huiyao, architect of the Thousand Talents program which has been accused by the governments of the United States, Australia, and Canada of facilitating widespread intellectual property theft and espionage on behalf of China.

In March 2023, Semafor released a video on their TikTok account calling US legislative proposals to ban the Chinese app "just the latest escalation in a mounting Cold War" and warning viewers the legislation "won’t stop at just TikTok."

In 2015, Semafor cofounder and CEO Justin B. Smith, then CEO of Bloomberg Media Group, ordered a Bloomberg journalist to end his investigation into the wealth of senior CCP officials because of the company’s business interests in China. According to NPR, the journalist was later fired, and his wife was threatened and pressured to sign a nondisclosure agreement by company lawyers.

References

External links

Internet properties established in 2022
Publications established in 2022
American news websites